Houshenzinus is a genus of East Asian dwarf spiders that was first described by A. V. Tanasevitch in 2006.  it contains only three species, found in China: H. rimosus, H. tengchongensis, and H. xiaolongha.

See also
 List of Linyphiidae species (A–H)

References

Araneomorphae genera
Linyphiidae
Spiders of China